Jonne  is a village in the administrative district of Gmina Lutocin, within Żuromin County, Masovian Voivodeship, in east-central Poland.

References

Jonne